The discography of Japanese singer Masayuki Suzuki includes 16 studio, 6 compilation, 4 cover albums (including 1 tribute album), a live album, 10 video albums, and 36 singles. Inspired by Western R&B acts and doo-wop songs, Suzuki formed a band Chanels in 1975, along with his friends and released their debut single "Runaway". Chanels would later be renamed to Rats & Star. In 1986, Suzuki made his solo debut through Mother of Pearl.

His 1995 release, Martini II became his best-selling effort in Japan, peaking at number one on the Oricon Albums Chart and getting certified Million by the Recording Industry Association of Japan (RIAJ). Suzuki released his third cover album, Discover Japan II in September 2014.

Albums

Studio albums

Compilation albums

Cover and tribute albums

Live albums

Box sets

Singles

As lead artist

Other charted songs

As featured artist

Other appearances

Videography

Video albums

Notes

References

External links
Masayuki Suzuki's discography on Sony Music Japan website

Rhythm and blues discographies
Discographies of Japanese artists